2 Andromedae, abbreviated 2 And, is a binary star system in the northern constellation of Andromeda. 2 Andromedae is the Flamsteed designation. It is a faint star system but visible to the naked eye with a combined apparent visual magnitude of 5.09. The binary nature of the star was discovered by American astronomer Sherburne Wesley Burnham at Lick Observatory in 1889. The pair orbit each other over a period of 74 years with a high eccentricity of 0.8.

The magnitude 5.26 primary, designated component A, is an A-type main-sequence star based on a stellar classification of A1V or A2V, although it may have already left the main sequence. It was identified as a candidate Lambda Boötis star, but this was ruled out by Paunzen et al. (2003) as it doesn't match the typical characteristics of these objects. Although 2 And does not display a significant infrared excess, it is a shell star that displays varying absorption features due to circumstellar dust grains. This may indicate it has an orbiting debris disk containing gas that is being viewed edge-on. The star is about 100 million years old and is spinning rapidly with a projected rotational velocity of 212 km/s.

The magnitude 7.43 secondary companion, component B, is a suspected variable star and may be a Delta Scuti variable.  Alternatively, it may be an ellipsoidal variable with a brown dwarf companion. It is an F-type main-sequence star with a class of F1V/F4.

References

External links
 Image 2 Andromedae

A-type main-sequence stars
F-type main-sequence stars
Delta Scuti variables
Shell stars
Binary stars
Circumstellar disks
02 Andromedae
Durchmusterung objects
Andromedae, 02
Gliese and GJ objects
217782
113788
8766